The Yahyaoui barbel (Luciobarbus yahyaouii) is a species of cyprinid fish endemic to Morocco found in the  Moulouya River.

References 

Yahyaoui barbel
Endemic fauna of Morocco
Freshwater fish of North Africa
Yahyaoui barbel